José Luis Elejalde Gorostiza (14 January 1951 – 18 February 2018) was a Cuban former footballer who competed in the 1976 Summer Olympics. He died on 18 February 2018 at the age of 67.

Club career
Nicknamed el Caballo (the Horse), Elejalde played in midfield for La Habana.

International career
He represented his country in 3 FIFA World Cup qualifying matches and played two games at the 1976 Summer Olympics.

References

External links
 

1951 births
2018 deaths
Association football midfielders
Cuban footballers
Olympic footballers of Cuba
Footballers at the 1976 Summer Olympics
Pan American Games medalists in football
Pan American Games bronze medalists for Cuba
FC Ciudad de La Habana players
Footballers at the 1971 Pan American Games
Medalists at the 1971 Pan American Games